"Choice in the Matter" is a song by American singer-songwriter Aimee Mann, which was released in 1996 as the second single from her second studio album I'm with Stupid. The song was written by Mann and Jon Brion, and produced by Brion.

"Choice in the Matter" was released as a promotional-only single in the United States and United Kingdom. In April 1996, it peaked at No. 12 in the US Billboard Adult Alternative Songs chart.

Background
Speaking to Chris Rubin of the San Francisco Chronicle in 1996, Mann said the song was about "someone realizing almost immediately that the person they're contemplating becoming involved with is not to be trusted". She added, "You can say to yourself, 'There is no choice, I can't get involved.' Problem solved. There is no possibility that you'll be involved in a horrible nightmare relationship."

Critical reception
On its release as a single, Larry Flick of Billboard described "Choice in the Matter" as a "quirky, instantly contagious cut". He noted the song's "jangly guitars, skittling pop beats, and fuzzy retro-pop texture" as well as Mann's "low-key, emotion-filled vocal attack". Cash Box selected "Choice in the Matter" as their "Pick of the Week" for the week of February 3, 1996. Reviewer Steve Baltin praised it as a "wonderful pop tune" which "combines Liz Phair type hooks with '60s pop grooves".

In a review of I'm with Stupid, Melissa Ruggieri of the Sun-Sentinel commented, "Mann isn't happy with people who have deceived her on 'Choice in the Matter', yet she doesn't lash out with the intensity of an Alanis Morissette, choosing instead to state her gripes in a warm, girlish voice over a chugging drumbeat." Chuck Campbell of the Scripps Howard News Service noted that "when a lover suspiciously ignores phone messages in her presence on the dense sounding 'Choice in the Matter,' she sees the flashing answering machine as a signal of deceit." Shane Danielsen of The Sydney Morning Herald considered songs such as 'Choice in the Matter' to "attest to Mann's melodic skills".

Track listing
CD single
"Choice in the Matter" (LP Version) - 3:13

Personnel
Choice in the Matter
 Aimee Mann – lead vocals, backing vocals, guitar
 Jon Brion – guitar, guitar solo, percussion, backing vocals
 Brad Hallen – bass
 John Sands – drums
 Glenn Tilbrook, Chris Difford – backing vocals

Production
 Jon Brion – producer
 Mike Denneen – recording
 Jack Joseph Puig – mixing
 Jonathan Wyner – mastering

Charts

References

1995 songs
1996 singles
Aimee Mann songs
Songs written by Aimee Mann
Songs written by Jon Brion
Song recordings produced by Jon Brion
Geffen Records singles